Dewi Griffiths (born 16 August 1931) is a BBC radio host and former Welsh television producer. He joined BBC Wales from the Royal Air Force where he became a producer of TV sports programmes, notably rugby union broadcasts. After his retirement, he hosted the nostalgia record programme A String of Pearls on BBC Radio Wales.

References

Living people
British television producers
Women television producers
Welsh radio presenters
BBC Radio Wales presenters
Welsh women radio presenters
1931 births
20th-century Royal Air Force personnel